Ware is an unincorporated community in Sherman Township, Pocahontas County, Iowa, United States.

History
Ware got its start following construction of the Chicago, Rock Island and Pacific Railroad through that territory. It was named for Francis L. Ware, who owned the town site.

References

Unincorporated communities in Pocahontas County, Iowa
Unincorporated communities in Iowa